Pain Marznak (also Romanized as Pā’īn Marznāk) is a village in Babol Kenar Rural District, Babol Kenar District, Babol County, Mazandaran Province, Iran. At the 2006 census, its population was 208, in 50 families.

References 

Populated places in Babol County